Jean Juste Gustave Lisch (10 June 1828 – 24 August 1910) was a French architect. 

A native of Alençon, Lisch studied at the Ecole des Beaux-Arts and was pupil of Léon Vaudoyer and Henri Labrouste.  His architectural career was geared towards civic work:  stations, public buildings, churches, and restoration of monuments. 

Juste retired in 1901 and died in Paris in 1910. He is buried in the Rouen monumental cemetery.

Selected works

 renovation of the oratory at Germigny-des-Prés, 1867–1876
 Champ de Mars–Tour Eiffel station, 1878
 Gare Saint-Lazare, with the attached Hôtel Terminus, Paris, 1885–87
 Le Havre station, 1888
 Javel station, Paris, 1889
 Avenue Foch station, Paris, 1900
 Invalides station, Paris, 1900
 La Rochelle town hall
 Lyon Magistrates' court
 Saint-Benoît-sur-Loire church
 Ferrières, Manche church
 Notre-Dame-de-Cléry church
 Château de Pierrefonds (the last part of renovation works, 1885)

References

1828 births
1910 deaths
People from Alençon
19th-century French architects